The 2015 Singapore Charity Shield (also known as the Great Eastern SG50 Charity Shield for sponsorship reasons as well as to commemorate Singapore's 50th year of independence) was the 8th edition of the Singapore Charity Shield held on 1 March 2015 at Jalan Besar Stadium, between the winners of the previous season's S.League and Singapore Cup competitions. The match was contested by 2014 S.League champions Warriors and 2014 Singapore Cup winners Balestier Khalsa.

Warriors won the Shield for the second time  after defeating Balestier Khalsa 1–0, with Nicolás Vélez netting the only goal.

Match

Details

See also
2015 S.League
2015 Singapore Cup
2015 Singapore League Cup

References

2015 in Singaporean football
2015 in Singapore